Ghosts of the Past is the fifth studio album by Australian rock band Eskimo Joe, released on 12 August 2011.

It is the band's first album to be released on their independent record label, Dirt Diamonds Productions. In an interview with the band, they described the album's sound as less polished than their previous album. Recording for the album began in late 2010 and finished in February 2011. 

The first track to be released was "When We Were Kids". On 24 June 2011, the second single titled "Love is a Drug" was released.

Track listing

Personnel 

Eskimo Joe
 Kavyen Temperley – vocals, bass, keyboards
 Stuart MacLeod – guitar, vocals
 Joel Quartermain – guitar, drums, vocals

Performance credits
 Hunter Temperley – hey's in "When We Were Kids"
 Mia Schafer Zaics – hey's in "When We Were Kids"
 Abeni Temperley – hey's in "When We Were Kids"

Visuals and imagery
 Brad Rimmer – photography
 Debaser – artwork

Instruments
 Aaron Wyatt – strings on "Sky's on Fire", "Speeding Car", "Itch", "Just Don't Feel"
 Emma McCoy – strings on "Sky's on Fire", "Speeding Car", "Itch", "Just Don't Feel"
 Rachael Aquilina – strings on "Sky's on Fire", "Speeding Car", "Itch", "Just Don't Feel"

Technical and production
 Eskimo Joe – production, engineering on "Just Don't Feel" (Wastelands Version), sequencing
 Matt Lovell – engineering
 Marcus Salisbury – engineering assistant
 Cenzo Townshend – mixing
 Andy Lawson – engineering, mixing on "Just Don't Feel"
 Joel Quartermain – mixing on "Just Don't Feel" (Wastelands Version)
 Leon Zervos – mastering
 James Hewgill – sequencing

Managerial
 Catherine Haridy – management

Charts

Weekly chart

Release history

References 

2011 albums
Eskimo Joe albums